Aung Naing Win (born 12 June 1997) is Burmese professional footballer who plays as a midfielder for Ayeyawady United F.C. and Myanmar U20.

International

References

1997 births
Living people
Burmese footballers
Myanmar international footballers
Ayeyawady United F.C. players
Association football midfielders